aicas GmbH is a software corporation headquartered in Germany with subsidiaries in France and the United States.

aicas provides Java technology and analysis tools for realtime and embedded systems. Its flagship product is JamaicaVM, a Java Virtual Machine with hard realtime garbage collection for time and safety critical applications, such as in avionics, automotive and industrial process control.

See also
Real time Java
Embedded Java

References

External links

Software companies of Germany
Java virtual machine
Privately held companies of Germany
Companies based in Karlsruhe
Software companies established in 2002